Cocculus diversifolius is a vine with the common name sarsaparilla or correjuela. It is native to Arizona, New Mexico, Texas, and much of Mexico as far south as Oaxaca. It is a vine climbing up to 3 m, with white to yellowish flowers and dark purple fruits up to 6 mm in diameter.

References 

diversifolius
Flora of Arizona
Flora of Mexico
Flora of New Mexico
Flora of Texas